The 1900–01 season was Stoke's 12th season of in the Football League.

It was a hard season for Stoke as they were almost relegated to the Second Division but survived after winning their final match of the season 4–2 away at Notts County.

Season review

League
By now Stoke had lost the valuable services of Tom Robertson, Jack Kennedy and Joe Turner while dedicated full-back Jack Eccles made only two appearances and later became club trainer as the team slowly broke up. Only two points were collected from their first eight games and a disjointed Stoke side slipped to the bottom of the table. The situation improved slightly with the arrival of Welsh forward Mart Watkins from Oswestry Town but Stoke were involved in a relegation dog-fight until the final day of the season.

On Good Friday (5 April 1901) Stoke went to Bury and were denied two blatant penalties and lost 3–2. This defeat left Stoke in 17th position, three points and one place above West Bromwich Albion who had three games in hand, while Preston and Wolves were just above them. Stoke's remaining two games were both away - to Wolves and Notts County. Preston ended their season with a home clash with West Brom who were struggling to find any form and looked doomed. Remarkably, Stoke upped their game and won both matches while Preston lost and went down with Albion leaving Stoke safe in 16th place. It had been a tense and difficult season and the club's finances were now in a very precarious state, both manager and chairman recognized this and the club would now look at the local leagues for players.

Unfortunately ace marksman William Maxwell bid farewell to Stoke at the end of the season joining Third Lanark for £250 after scoring 85 goals in 173 games for the "Potters" and he would be sorely missed.

FA Cup
The 1900–01 season saw Stoke having to play in the Intermediate Round which was a consequence of their secretary failing to get their entry to the competition to the FA by the required time. Stoke beat Second Division Glossop 1–0. In the first round Stoke lost 2–1 in a replay to Small Heath after a 1–1 draw at the Victoria Ground.

Final league table

Results
Stoke's score comes first

Legend

Football League First Division

FA Cup

Squad statistics

References

Stoke City F.C. seasons
Stoke